Þórir Jóhann Helgason (born 28 September 2000) is an Icelandic professional footballer who plays as an attacking midfielder for  club Lecce and the Iceland national team.

Club career
On 15 July 2021, Þórir signed a four-year contract with an option for fifth year with Serie B club Lecce.

International career
Þórir made his international debut for Iceland on 29 May 2021 in a friendly match against Mexico in Arlington, Texas.

Career statistics

Scores and results list Iceland's goal tally first, score column indicates score after each Þórir goal.

Honours
International
Baltic Cup: 2022

References

External links
 

2000 births
Living people
Thorir Johann Helgason
Association football midfielders
Thorir Johann Helgason
Thorir Johann Helgason
Thorir Johann Helgason
Thorir Johann Helgason
Thorir Johann Helgason
Serie A players
Þórir Jóhann Helgason
Thorir Johann Helgason
U.S. Lecce players
Thorir Johann Helgason
Icelandic expatriate sportspeople in Italy
Expatriate footballers in Italy